Raif Özkan Uğur (born October 17, 1953) is a Turkish pop musician, member of the renowned band MFÖ and an actor.

He was born as the 5th child of his family. He graduated Reşat Nuri Güntekin Primary School where he met and started playing mandolin. Afterwards, while he was studying in Fenerbahçe High School, he formed a band called  Atomikler and covered popular songs of the time.

He started his career as a musician in the Şerif Yüzbaşıoğlu Orchestra as a bass guitarist. In 1971, Özkan joined Mazhar Alanson and Fuat Güner in the duo "Kaygısızlar" ("The Unworrieds") The band was dissolved in 1972. Between 1972 and 1975, Özkan played Anatolian rock music with Barış Manço in his band Kurtalan Ekspres, in "TER" of Erkin Koray, "Dostlar" of Edip Akbayram, "Kardaşlar" of Seyhan Karabay and "Dadaşlar" of Ersen. In 1976, he left Anatolian rock music genre and joined the quintet "İpucu" led by the MFÖ trio. Özkan formed in 1978 the band "Grup Karma" with Galip Boransu and Cengiz Teoman. He is now playing in the group MFÖ (the three letters stand for the names of the three members: Mazhar Alanson, Fuat Güner, Özkan Uğur). While playing the bass guitar in MFÖ, he performs incredibly difficult vocals with his tenor timbre. He released "Aynada" ("In The Mirror" in Turkish) single from DMC in 2016.

He was also a judge in O Ses Türkiye (Turkish version of The Voice).

Discography

Barış Manço & Kurtalan Ekspres 
 1972: Ölüm Allah'ın Emri / Gamzedeyim Deva Bulmam
 1973: Gönül Dağı / Hey Koca Topçu 
 1973: Nazar Eyle / Gülme Ha Gülme

Erkin Koray & Ter 
 1972: Hor Görme Garibi / Züleyha

Mazhar-Fuat 
 1974: Türküz Türkü Çağırırız (LP)

Edip Akbayram & Dostlar 
 1974: Garip / Kaşların Karasına

Ersen & Dadaşlar 
 1975: Dostlar Merhaba / Ne Sevdiğin Belli Ne Sevmediğin
 1975: Gafil Gezme Şaşkın / Güzele Bak Güzele
 1976: Ekmek Parası / Zalim

Selda & Dadaşlar 
 1976: Türkülerimiz (LP)

Seyhan Karabay & Kardaşlar 
 1976: Kan Davası / Dam Üstünde Çul Serer

İpucu Beşlisi 
 1976: Heyecanlı / Hop Otur Hop Kalk

Grup Karma 
 1978: İmkansız / Mutlu Mu Gülenler

MFÖ

Filmography

Movies
 Arkadaşım Şeytan, 1988
 Eşkıya, 1996
 Komser Şekspir, 2000
 G.O.R.A., 2004
 Kısık Ateşte 15 Dakika, 2006
 A.R.O.G, 2009
 Yahşi Batı, 2010
 Pek Yakında, 2014
 Arif V 216, 2018
 Karakomik Filmler, 2019
 Karakomik Filmler 2, 2020

TV series
 İkinci Bahar, 1999
 Yeter Anne, 2002
 Alacakaranlık, 2003
 İstanbul Şahidimdir, 2004
 Cennet Mahallesi, 2004 (Show TV)
 Sıkı Dostlar, 2009 (Türkmax - Fox TV)
 Türk Malı, 2010 (Show TV)
 Şubat, 2012-2013 (TRT 1)
 Poyraz Karayel, 2015-2016 (Kanal D)
 Jet Sosyete, 2019 (episode 40)

Film score
 Arkadaşım Şeytan, 1988
 G.O.R.A, 2004

References

 Biyografi.info - Özkan Uğur

External links
 Biography 
 Sinematürk 
 Cennet Mahallesi

1953 births
Turkish pop musicians
Turkish male film actors
Turkish film score composers
Living people
Turkish male television actors
Turkish bass guitarists
Eurovision Song Contest entrants for Turkey
Eurovision Song Contest entrants of 1985
Eurovision Song Contest entrants of 1988